Sari Chabab Mécheria, known as SC Mécheria or simply SCM for short, is an Algerian football club based in Mécheria. The club was founded in 1936 and its colours are red and white. Their home stadium, 20 August 1955 Stadium, has a capacity of 10,000 spectators. The club is currently playing in the Algerian Ligue 2.

History
The club was founded on 1936 under the name of Association Sportive de Mécheria. The club changed the name in several times as below, Sporting Club de Mécheria, Union Sportive Santé de Mécheria, Chabab Riadhi Baladiat Mécheria and Chabab Riadhi Mécheria.

On May 28, 2022, SC Mécheria promoted to the Algerian Ligue 2.

Honours
Division 3
Champions (4): 1982, 1990, 1996, 2000

Algerian Cup
Runners-up: 2001

References

External links
Club profile - eurosport.fr

Football clubs in Algeria
SC Mécheria
Association football clubs established in 1936
1936 establishments in Algeria